Soundelux Design Music Group is an American sound studio located in Hollywood, California.

Soundelux Design Music Group specializes in sound design, music composition and voiceover recording for video games. It is part of Todd Soundelux, formerly known as CSS Studios, LLC.

In December 2013, Soundelux Design Music Group was merged with another studio, POP Sound, with POP Sound being the surviving company in the merger.

Games credits
2014
Bayonetta 2 - Nintendo / PlatinumGames

2013
Metal Gear Rising: Revengeance - Konami / PlatinumGames
Skylanders: Swap Force - Activision
The Wonderful 101 - Nintendo / PlatinumGames

2012
Kid Icarus: Uprising - Nintendo
PlayStation All-Stars Battle Royale - Sony Computer Entertainment

2011
Ace Combat: Assault Horizon - Namco Bandai

2010
Final Fantasy XIV - Square Enix
God of War III - Sony Computer Entertainment
Lost Planet 2 - Capcom
Metal Gear Solid: Peace Walker - Konami
Professor Layton and the Unwound Future - Nintendo
Vanquish - Sega / PlatinumGames

2009
Bayonetta - Sega / PlatinumGames
Resident Evil 5 - Capcom
Resistance: Retribution - Sony Computer Entertainment

2008
Bionic Commando - Capcom
Dead Space - EA
Fable II - Lionhead Studios
God of War: Chains of Olympus - Sony Computer Entertainment
Lost Planet: Colonies - Capcom
Metal Gear Solid 4: Guns of the Patriots - Konami

2007
Age of Empires: The Asian Dynasties - Ensemble Studios/Microsoft
Assassin's Creed - Ubisoft
Crysis - Crytek
God of War II - Sony Computer Entertainment
Golden Compass - F9E/Sega
Devil May Cry 4 - Capcom
Hannah Montana - Disney Interactive Studios
High School Musical - Disney Interactive
Lair - Sony Computer Entertainment
Metal Gear Solid: Portable Ops - Konami
Monster Hunter Freedom 2 - Capcom
No More Heroes - Ubisoft / Grasshopper Manufacture
Pirates of the Caribbean: At World's End - Disney Interactive Studios
Pirates of the Caribbean Online - Disney VR Studio
Stranglehold - Midway
Surf's Up - Ubisoft
Syphon Filter: Logan's Shadow - Sony Computer Entertainment
Transformers: The Game - Activision

2006
Dead Rising - Capcom
Final Fight: Streetwise - Capcom
God Hand - Capcom / Clover Studio
Lost Planet: Extreme Condition - Capcom
Marc Eckō's Getting Up: Contents Under Pressure - Atari
Marvel: Ultimate Alliance - Activision
Monster Hunter 2 - Capcom
Onimusha: Dawn Of Dreams - Capcom
Pirates of the Caribbean: Dead Man's Chest - Disney Interactive Studios
SOCOM U.S. Navy Seals: Combined Assault - Sony Computer Entertainment
SOCOM U.S. Navy Seals: Fireteam Bravo 2 - Sony Computer Entertainment
Star Trek: Legacy - Bethesda Softworks
Syphon Filter: Dark Mirror - Sony Computer Entertainment
The Fast and the Furious - Namco Bandai
The Lord of the Rings: The Battle for Middle-earth II - Electronic Arts

2005
Ape Escape 3 - Sony Computer Entertainment
Ape Escape: On the Loose - Sony Computer Entertainment
Area 51 - Midway
Devil May Cry 3: Dante's Awakening - Capcom
God of War - Sony Computer Entertainment
Haunting Ground - Capcom
Killer7 - Capcom / Grasshopper Manufacture
Lineage II: The Chaotic Chronicle - NC Soft
Mortal Kombat: Shaolin Monks - Midway
Need For Speed: Most Wanted - Electronic Arts
Resident Evil 4 - Capcom
Samurai Western - Atlus
Viewtiful Joe: Red Hot Rumble - Capcom / Clover Studio

2004
Chaos Legion - Capcom
Everquest 2 - SOE
Gungrave: Overdose - Mastiff
Maximo vs. Army of Zin - Capcom
Shadow Ops: Red Mercury - Zombie Entertainment/Atari
SD Gundam Force: Showdown! - Bandai
The Chronicles of Riddick: Escape from Butcher Bay - Vivendi Universal Games
The Lord of the Rings: Battle for Middle Earth - Electronic Arts
Viewtiful Joe 2 - Capcom / Clover Studio

2003
Arc the Lad: Twilight of the Spirits - Sony Computer Entertainment
Devil May Cry 2 - Capcom
P.N.03 - Capcom
Terminator 3: Rise of the Machines - Atari
Toontown Online - Disney VR Studio
Viewtiful Joe - Capcom

2002
Dark Cloud 2 - Sony Computer Entertainment
La Pucelle: Tactics - Mastiff
Red Faction II - THQ
Resident Evil - Capcom
Steel Battalion - Capcom / Nude Maker

2001
Devil May Cry - Capcom
Anachronox - Ion Storm

Notable Classics
Mechwarrior 2: 31st Century Combat - Activision
Descent - Interplay
Pitfall: The Mayan Adventure - Activision

References

External links
Official website

Recording studios in California